The June Revolution (Albanian: Kryengritja e Qershorit or Lëvizja e Qershorit) also known as the Antibourgeois Democratic Revolution(Albanian: Revolucioni Demokrat Antiborgjez) refers to a peasant insurgency backed by the parliamentary opposition of the Zogu Government.

Background
Following the 1923 Albanian elections results, Zogu's faction won 44 seats and opposition candidates 39. The 19 independent, mostly conservative candidates supported Zogu, allowing him to form a government. However, the opposition parties alleged electoral fraud, claiming that their strong performance in the first round of voting should have led to them winning a majority in the second round.

On April 20, 1924 Avni Rustemi, an Albanian politician, was shot in the street of Tirana by an agent of the Toptani Family (because of his murder of Essad Toptani). His death gave rise to the anti-government demonstrations that led to the June Revolution.

Events
The Uprising was split into two fronts: The Northern Front organized by the Committee of Kosovo and led by Bajram Curri which supported Noli due to the rivalry between them and the government of Zogu, and the southern front which was led by Riza Cerova. The Uprising was strongly supported by Albanian Peasants. The Albanian peasantry appeared diverse. Part of them dreamed of owning a piece of land or expanding the small amount of land they owned. The rest wanted to be freed from heavy and numerous state obligations, such as the tithe, the jalap tax, the slavery tax, and other wastes of the feudal system. The Southern Front was composed of the Përmet Garrison and Volunteers from Skrapar. Following several Skirmishes against the government forces, Riza Cerova leading an armed group of ~120 men would take over Berat and would make his way to Tirana. In Kozare he encountered Osman Gazep who was sent from Tirana with a battalion to suppress the uprising. Following the Battle of Kozare, Cerova would defeat the Government Forces and would occupy Lushnje where he was attacked by Osman's forces again but managed to defeat them. Around this time the Vlora volunteers would arrive to assist the Uprising. With all of the southern forces, the rebels would occupy Tirana as Ahmet Zogu would flee to Yugoslavia. According to US estimates, 20 people were killed and 35 were injured on the northern front, while 6 people were killed and 15 were injured on the southern front.

Aftermath
Following the occupation of Tirana, Fan Noli would become the Prime Minister of Albania. Noli, an idealist, rejected demands for new elections on the grounds that Albania needed a "paternal" government. Noli's coalition would propose his "Twenty Points Program" that would see the implementation of radical reforms in Albania. He would fail to implement it, however, as he failed to gather the financial support.

Eventually, on 13 December 1924 Ahmet Zogu, with 1,000 Yugoslav and Russian volunteers financed by Belgrade would cross into the Albanian Border, and on Christmas Eve it would reclaim the capital as Noli would flee to Italy. Noli's government only lasted for 6 months.

The exiled members of the revolution would go on to form KONARE.

References 

Revolutions
Modern history of Albania
20th century in Albania
1920s in Albania
1924 in Albania